Antisemitism and the New Testament is the discussion of how Christian views of Judaism in the New Testament have contributed to discrimination against Jewish people throughout history and in the present day.

A. Roy Eckardt, a writer in the field of Jewish-Christian relations, asserted that the foundation of antisemitism and responsibility for the Holocaust lies ultimately in the New Testament. Eckardt insisted that Christian repentance must include a reexamination of basic theological attitudes toward Jews and the New Testament in order to deal effectively with antisemitism. Other historians, such as Richard Steigmann-Gall, have argued that Nazism as a whole was either unrelated to Christianity or actively opposed to it.

James Dunn has argued that the New Testament contributed toward subsequent antisemitism in the Christian community. According to Louis Feldman, the term "antisemitism" is an "absurdity which the Jews took over from the Germans." He thinks the proper term is anti-Judaism. The distinction between anti-Judaism and antisemitism is often made, or challenged, with regard to early Christian hostility to Jews: some, notably Gavin I. Langmuir, prefer anti-Judaism, which implies a theological enmity. They say that the concept of antisemitism "makes little sense" in the nascent days of the Christian religion and that it would not emerge until later. In this context, the term antisemitism implies the secular biological race theories of modern times. Peter Schäfer prefers the word Judaeophobia for pagan hostility to Jews, but considers the word antisemitism, even if anachronistic, synonymous with this term, while adding that Christian anti-Judaism eventually was crucial to what later became antisemitism. Dunn argues that the various New Testament expressions of anger and hurt by a minority puzzled by the refusal of a majority to accept their claims about Jesus the Jew reflect inner tensions between Jewish communities not yet unified by rabbinical Judaism, and a Christianity not yet detached from Judaism. The Greek word Ioudaioi used throughout the New Testament could refer either to Jews or, more restrictively, to Judeans alone.

The idea that the New Testament is antisemitic is a controversy that has emerged in the aftermath of the Holocaust and is often associated with a thesis put forward by Rosemary Ruether. Debates surrounding various positions partly revolve around how antisemitism is defined, and on scholarly disagreements over whether antisemitism has a monolithic continuous history or is instead an umbrella term covering many distinct kinds of hostility to Jews over history.

Factional agendas underpin the writing of the canonical texts, and the various New Testament documents are windows into the conflict and debates of that period. According to Timothy Johnson, mutual slandering among competing sects was quite strong in the period when these works were composed. The New Testament moreover is an ensemble of texts written over decades and "it is quite meaningless to speak about a single New Testament attitude".

The New Testament and Christian antisemitism

According to Rabbi Michael J. Cook, Professor of Intertestamental and Early Christian Literature at the Hebrew Union College, there are ten themes in the New Testament that have been sources of anti-Judaism and antisemitism:

Cook believes that both contemporary Jews and contemporary Christians need to reexamine the history of early Christianity, and the transformation of Christianity from a Jewish sect consisting of followers of a Jewish Jesus, to a separate religion often dependent on the tolerance of Rome while proselytizing among gentiles loyal to the Roman Empire, to understand how the story of Jesus came to be recast in an anti-Jewish form as the Gospels took their final form.

Some scholars assert that critical verses in the New Testament have been used to incite prejudice and violence against Jewish people. Professor Lillian C. Freudmann, author of Antisemitism in the New Testament (University Press of America, 1994) has published a study of such verses and the effects that they have had in the Christian community throughout history. Similar studies have been made by both Christian and Jewish scholars, including, Professors Clark Williamsom (Christian Theological Seminary), Hyam Maccoby (The Leo Baeck Institute), Norman A. Beck (Texas Lutheran College),  and Michael Berenbaum (Georgetown University).

New Testament

There are some verses in the New Testament that describe Jews in a positive way, attributing to them salvation or divine love.

According to the New Testament Gospels, Jesus, on his fateful entry into Jerusalem before Passover, was received by a great crowd of people. Jesus was arrested and tried by the Sanhedrin. After the trial, Jesus was handed over to Pontius Pilate, who duly tried him again and, at the urging of the people, had him crucified.

The New Testament records that Jesus' disciple Judas Iscariot, the Roman governor Pontius Pilate along with Roman forces and the leaders and people of Jerusalem were (to varying degrees) responsible for the death of Jesus.

Gospel of Mark
According to the Gospel of Mark, the crucifixion of Jesus was authorized by Roman authorities at the insistence of leading Jews (Judeans) from the Sanhedrin.

Paul H. Jones writes:

Gospel of Matthew

The Gospel of Matthew is often evaluated as the most Jewish of the canonical gospels, and yet it is sometimes argued that it is anti-Judaic or antisemitic.

The Gospel of Matthew has given readers the impression his hostility to Jews increases as his narrative progresses, until it culminates in chapter 23. In chapter 21, the parable of the vineyard, which is strikingly similar to Isaiah 5:1-30, is followed by the great "stone" text, an early Christological interpretation of Psalm 118: "The stone that the builders rejected has become the cornerstone". The Old Testament allusions appear to suggest that the author thought God would call to account Israel's leaders for maltreating Christ, and that the covenant will pass to the gentiles who follow Christ, a view that arose in intersectarian polemics in Judaism between the followers of Christ and the Jewish leadership. Then, in chapters 23 and 24, three successive hostile pericopes are recorded. First, a series of "woes" are pronounced against the Pharisees:

Certain passages which speak of the destruction of Jerusalem have elements that are interpreted as indications of Matthew's anti-Judaic attitudes. Jesus is said to have lamented over the capital: "Jerusalem, Jerusalem, the city that kills the prophets and stones those who are sent to it...See, your house is left to you, desolate". Again, Jesus is made to predict the demise of the Temple: "Truly I tell you, not one stone will be left here upon another; all will be thrown down". Such visions of an end to the old Temple may be read as embodying the replacement theology, according to which Christianity supersedes Judaism.

The culmination of this rhetoric, and arguably the one verse that has caused more Jewish suffering than any other second Testament passage, is the uniquely Matthean attribution to the Jewish people:

This so-called "blood guilt" text has been interpreted to mean that all Jews, of Jesus' time and forever afterward, accept responsibility for the death of Jesus. Shelly Matthews writes:

Douglas Hare noted that the Gospel of Matthew avoids sociological explanations for persecution:

The term "Jews" in the Gospel of Matthew is applied to those who deny the resurrection of Jesus and believe that the disciples stole Jesus's corpse.

Gospel of John
In the Gospel of John, the word Ἰουδαῖοι, or the Jews, is used 63 times, in a hostile sense 31 times, and no distinctions are made between Jewish groups. The Sadducees, for example, prominent elsewhere, are not distinguished. The enemies of Jesus are described collectively as "the Jews", in contradistinction to the other evangelists, who do not generally ascribe to "the Jews" collectively calls for the death of Jesus. In the other three texts, the plot to put Jesus to death is always presented as coming from a small group of priests and rulers, the Sadducees. The Gospel of John is the primary source of the image of "the Jews" acting collectively as the enemy of Jesus, which later became fixed in Christian minds.

John himself has Jesus tell the Samaritan woman that "salvation is from the Jews." For example, in John 7:1-9, Jesus moves around in Galilee but avoids Judea, because "the Jews" were looking for a chance to kill him. In 7:12-13 some said "he is a good man" whereas others said he deceives the people, but these were all "whispers", no one would speak publicly for "fear of the Jews". Jewish rejection is also recorded in  7:45-52, 8:39-59, 10:22-42, and 12:36-43. John 12:42 says many did believe, but they kept it private, for fear the Pharisees would exclude them from the synagogue. After the crucifixion, 20:19 has the disciples hiding behind locked doors, "for fear of the Jews".

In several places, John's gospel also associates "the Jews" with darkness and with the devil. In John 8:37-39; 44–47, Jesus says, speaking to a group of Pharisees:

Although it has been claimed that the modern consensus is that the term  (Jews) in John refers exclusively to religious authorities, the basis for this claim has been challenged and John's use of the term Jews remains a complex and debated area of biblical scholarship. New Testament scholar J.G. Dunn writes:

Reflecting the consensus that John's use of the term refers strictly to Jewish religious authorities, some modern translations, such as Today's New International Version, remove the term "Jews" and replace it with more specific terms to avoid antisemitic connotations. For example, Messianic Bibles, as well as the Jesus Seminar, often translate this as "Judeans", i.e. residents of Judea, in contrast to residents of Galilee, a translation which has not found general acceptance in the wider Christian community.

Later commentary
Successive generations of Christians read in the Gospel of John the collective guilt of Jews, universally and in all generations, in the death of Christ. John's use of the collective expression "the Jews" is likely explained by the historical circumstances in which and audience for which he wrote. With the destruction of the Temple in 70 AD, the Jewish priesthood, and thus the class of the Sadducees was massacred and thus ceased to exist, due to its role in the First Jewish–Roman War. As John wrote his Gospel after these events, for a gentile audience, he spoke generically of Jews, rather than specifying a group within Judaism that no longer existed and that would have been unfamiliar to his readers.

First Epistle to the Thessalonians
Paul writes in 1 Thessalonians 2:14-16 as follows:

The text appears somewhat anomalous compared to the general tone of thanksgiving, in that we have a diatribe against persecutors identified as Jews. The text appears to flagrantly contradict what Paul writes in chapters 9 to 11 of his Epistle to the Romans. This has led several scholars to question its authenticity, and suggest that it is an interpolation. According to Pieter Willem van der Horst, there is an instance of antisemitic statements in one of the Pauline epistles; David Luckensmeyer maintains that it was not written with the intent to condemn all Jews, Paul's letters reveal someone who lived his life within Judaism, but did at the same time have an antisemitic effect. F. F. Bruce called it an 'indiscriminate anti-Jewish polemic' mirroring Graeco-Roman pagan attitudes to the Jews. Gene Green, Ernest Best, T. Holtz, Amy Downey variously argue that it resonates with Old Testament themes, plays on Jewish fears of being the "privileged people of God" and typical of an argumentative style shared by Greeks and Jews alike and thus, in Downey's words, exemplifying an intracultural clash between Paul the Jew and Jewish leaders opposing the propagation of Gospel ideas in both Judea and Thessalonia.

Epistle to the Hebrews
Most scholars consider the Epistle to the Hebrews to have been written for Christians who were tempted to return to Judaism. Lillian Freudmann thinks that it in trying to argue the superiority of Christianity to Judaism, it twisted Old Testament passages in a way that transmitted an anti-Torah antisemitism. John Gager reads it as a polemic against Judaism, not the Jewish people, and regards it as the most important anti-Judaizing text of early Christianity. Samuel Sandmel asserts that rather than vilifying Judaism, or the Jews of that age, the Epistle to the Hebrews is an argument for the supersessionist notion that Christianity is the pinnacle of ancient Judaism. William L. Lane dismissed the idea that it contains an anti-Judaic polemic, its primary concern being simply to assert that the Old Testament prophecies had been fulfilled. Those who see in its discontinuities antisemitism are wrong William Hagner argued: there may be anti-Judaism, but no antagonism for Jews. While it promotes supersessionism it venerates the Hebrew saints, for Donald Bloesch, and therefore what it is exhorting is the replacement of Jewish institutions, not Jews. For Timothy Johnson, Christianity had to struggle to survive amid a majority of sects that were not Messianic, and whatever slander there is, is to be understood as the rhetoric of a marginal group against the majority of Jews. Such rhetorical vehemence was common in antiquity in religious and philosophical disputes.

Book of Revelation
In Revelation 2:9 and 3:9 reference is made to a "synagogue of Satan" (συναγωγή τοῦ Σατανᾶ). At Revelation 2:9 we have:

At 3:9 one reads:

There is no certainty about who are those claiming falsely to be Jews: whether they are Jews hostile to gentiles, Jewish Christians persecuted by a Jewish majority, Jews who are practicing a "false" form of Judaism or gentiles feigning to be Jews.
The traditional interpretation upheld until recently by a majority of scholars took this to denote Jews hostile to Christians, and specifically to the Jewish communities of Smyrna (2:9) and Philadelphia (3:9). In the Smyrna passage, according to Koester, those claiming to be Jews probably bore in their traits the usual markers of kinship, circumcision, dietary restriction and Sabbath observance, but are taken to task for denouncing the Christian community to the Roman authorities to get them arrested.

This has recently been questioned by Elaine Pagels, David Frankfurter, Heinrich Kraft and John W. Marshall. Pagels, reviewing the literature, argues that the author of Revelation, John of Patmos, was himself a Jew devoted to Christ, saw himself as a Jew, not a Christian. Unlike the other evangelists who blame Jews for Christ's death, the author of Revelation, drawing on old patterns of late Jewish eschatological imagery, assigns responsibility for his death to Romans and says they are abetted by an internal enemy who feign to be God's people while acting as agents of Satan, a theme also present in the literature of the Qumran sectaries. Pagels identifies most of these internal enemies as converts to the Pauline doctrine and teachings prevailing among gentiles. Taken literally the passage at Revelations 3:9 would refer to gentiles upstaging Jewish followers of Jesus, feigning to be more Jewish than Jews themselves. Paul Duff on the other hand assumes they are Jews, like John himself, but Jews who are hostile to the Jesus movement. David Frankfurter has revived the old argument of Ferdinand Baur by endorsing the view that in fact the members of Satan's synagogue are mostly gentiles, claiming Israel's legacy while rebuffing religious practices that are obligatory for Jews. Even those who, like David Aune, consider that the phrase indicates Jews, not gentiles, allow that the Book of Revelation is virtually devoid of traces of the polemics between Christians and Jews typical of those times. Pagels concludes that the evidence weighs in favour of reading the 'synagogue of Satan' as referring to gentile converts to the Pauline version of the Jesus movement, who denominate themselves as 'those of Christ/Christians', a terminology never used by John of Patmos.

It has been argued that the idea of a Jewish Antichrist developed from these verses.

Christian responses
In the decree Nostra aetate in 1965, Pope Paul VI declared that 
True, the Jewish authorities and those who followed their lead pressed for the death of Christ; still, what happened in His passion cannot be charged against all the Jews, without distinction, then alive, nor against the Jews of today. Although the Church is the new people of God, the Jews should not be presented as rejected or accursed by God, as if this followed from the Holy Scriptures.David Cymet,History Vs. Apologetics: The Holocaust, the Third Reich, and the Catholic Church, Lexington Books 2010 p.449.

Norman A. Beck, professor of theology and classical languages at Texas Lutheran University, has proposed that Christian lectionaries remove what he calls "… the specific texts identified as most problematic …". Beck identifies what he deems to be offensive passages in the New Testament and indicates the instances in which these texts or portions thereof are included in major lectionary series.

Daniel Goldhagen, former Associate Professor of Political Science at Harvard University, also suggested in his book A Moral Reckoning that the Roman Catholic Church should change its doctrine and the accepted Biblical canon to excise statements he labels as antisemitic – he counts some 450 such passages in the Synoptic Gospels and Acts of the Apostles alone – to indicate that "The Jews' way to God is as legitimate as the Christian way".

The Church of England Faith and Order Commission document God's Unfailing Word: Theological and Practical Perspectives on Christian-Jewish Relations addresses the matter of New Testament texts and connection to antisemitism: "Varying theological emphases within the Church of England regarding the doctrine of scriptural interpretation and authority may have a bearing on how such concerns are addressed."

See also
 Anti-Judaism in early Christianity
 Christian–Jewish reconciliation
 Christianity and Judaism
 Origins of Christianity

Notes

References

Further reading
 Baum, Gregory, The Jews and the Gospel: A Re-examination of the New Testament, Newman Press (1961); reprinted as Is the New Testament Anti-semitic?, Paulist Press (1965)
 Evans, Craig A. and Donald A. Hagner, eds., Anti-Semitism and Early Christianity: Issues of Polemic and Faith, Fortress Press (1993); 
 Freudmann, Lillian C. Antisemitism in the New Testament, University Press of America (1994); 
 Gomes, Peter J. "The Bible and Anti-Semitism: Christianity's Original Sin", Chapter 6 in The Good Book: Reading the Bible with Mind and Heart, William Morrow (1996); 
 Hagner, Donald A., "Anti-Semitism", Dictionary of Jesus and the Gospels, 2 ed., Green, Brown and Perrin, eds., IVP Academic (2013); 
 Kee, Howard Clark, and Irvin J. Borowsky, eds., Removing the Anti-Judaism from the New Testament, Philadelphia: American Interfaith Institute (1998); 
 Stendahl, Krister, "Anti-Semitism", The Oxford Companion to the Bible, Metzger and Coogan, eds., Oxford University Press (1993); pp. 32–34. 
 

Ancient Christian antisemitism
Judaism in the New Testament